Momodou Lamin Sonko (born 31 January 2005) is a Swedish professional footballer who plays for Häcken.

Club career 
Momodou Sonko played with Västra Frölunda in Gothenburg, before moving to BK Häcken in 2020. There he quickly appeared as one of the most promising youth players of the club. 

Sonko signed his first long-term professional contract with the Allsvenskan club in May 2022. His professional debut for Häcken followed on the 30 August 2022, starting in a 2–1 Cup victory against Älmhult.

He made his Allsvenskan debut on 2 October 2022, replacing Erik Friberg during a 1–1 away draw to Varbergs BoIS.

At the end of the season he was fully promoted to the first team, after he helped them win their first ever national championship.

He took the spotlight right at the start of the 2023 season, scoring a goal and delivering an assist, as he started a 5–0 win home Cup win to Jönköpings Södra.

International career 
Momodou Sonko is a youth international for Sweden, having played with the under-17 and under-18 selections.

Honours 
BK Häcken

 Allsvenskan: 2022

References

External links

2005 births
Living people
Swedish footballers
Sweden youth international footballers
Association football forwards
Sportspeople from Gothenburg
BK Häcken players
Allsvenskan players